Erik Lee Preminger (born December 11, 1944) is an American writer, actor, and producer.

Early life 
Preminger's birth name was Eric Lee Kirkland. His true paternity was not known to him until he was an adult. He was named by his mother Gypsy Rose Lee and her then-husband, Alexander Kirkland. His father was film director Otto Preminger. He was the only nephew of actress June Havoc, Gypsy Rose Lee's younger sister.

Personal life 
He wrote an autobiography about his relationship with his mother: Gypsy & Me: At Home and on the Road with Gypsy Rose Lee (Little, Brown - 1984) which was later re-issued as My G-String Mother: At Home and Backstage With Gypsy Rose Lee.

In 1967, he married flight attendant Barbara van Nattem, but the marriage ended in divorce.

Filmography

Film

References

External links 

New York Times movie listing for Erik Lee Preminger
Review of Gypsy Rose Lee's Home Movies
Erik's Gypsy Rose Lee Website

1944 births
Living people
American male film actors
American memoirists
American people of Austrian-Jewish descent
Jewish American male actors
Jewish American writers
People from Contra Costa County, California
Writers from New York City
American biographers
21st-century American Jews